Podocarpus sellowii is a species of conifer in the family Podocarpaceae. It is found only in Brazil.

Description
Podocarpus sellowii grows as a small tree. Lichens and mosses grow epiphytically on the tree.

Distribution and habitat
Podocarpus sellowii is endemic to Brazil, where it is confined to areas of the Atlantic Forest in the south of the country.

Conservation
Podocarpus sellowii has been assessed as Endangered on the IUCN Red List. It is threatened by conversion of land for agriculture. Only limited parts of the species' range are in protected areas.

References

sellowii
Endemic flora of Brazil
Taxonomy articles created by Polbot